Zhang Han may refer to the following people surnamed Zhang:

 Zhang Han (Qin dynasty) (?–205 BC), Qin dynasty general
 Zhang Han (Ming dynasty) (1511–1593), Ming dynasty scholar and official
 Hans Zhang (born 1984), Chinese actor, singer and host
 Chang Han (born 1985), Taiwanese football player
 Zhang Jiying (given name Zhang Han), Chinese statesman of late three kingdom period and Jin dynasty

See also
 Han Zhang, a fictional character from the novel The Seven Heroes and Five Gallants, surnamed Han